The 2016–17 Colorado State Rams men's basketball team represented Colorado State University during the 2016–17 NCAA Division I men's basketball season. The team was coached by Larry Eustachy in his fifth season. They played their home games at the Moby Arena on Colorado State University's main campus in Fort Collins, Colorado as members of the Mountain West Conference. They finished the season 24–12, 13–5 in Mountain West play to finish in second place. They defeated Air Force and San Diego State to advance to the championship game of the Mountain West tournament where they lost to Nevada. They were invited to the 2017 National Invitation Tournament where they defeated the College of Charleston in the first round before losing in the second round to Cal State Bakersfield.

Previous season
The Rams finished the season 18–16, 8–10 in Mountain West play to finish in a tie for sixth place. They defeated San Jose State and Boise State to advance to the semifinals of the Mountain West tournament where they lost to Fresno State. They did not participate in a postseason tournament.

Offseason

Departures

Incoming transfers

2016 recruiting class
Colorado State did not have any incoming players in the 2016 recruiting class.

2017 recruiting class

Roster

Schedule and results

|-
!colspan=9 style=| Exhibition

|-
!colspan=9 style=| Non-conference regular season

|-
!colspan=9 style=| Mountain West regular season

|-
!colspan=9 style=| Mountain West tournament 

|-
!colspan=9 style=| NIT

References 

Colorado State Rams men's basketball seasons
Colorado State
Colorado State
Colorado State Rams
Colorado State Rams